Francisco León Barrios (born 4 October 1974), known as Paco León is a Spanish actor, producer, director, screenwriter and activist.

Born in Seville, León began his career in television comedy roles in Andalusian regional productions. Following appearances in sketch show , he became popular in Spain for his performance from 2005 to 2014 in sitcom Aída, portraying Luisma, a good-natured rehabilitated drug addict. In addition to his acting career, he has also pursued an activity as a filmmaker and show creator, starting with his debut feature Carmina or Blow Up (2012), for which he was nominated to the Goya Award for Best New Director. He has since featured in series such as The House of Flowers and Arde Madrid (also show creator) and films such as Kiki, Love to Love (also director).

He is also a prominent campaigner for HIV/AIDS causes.

Career
León's first roles were in comedy television, on Mariquilla Ríe Perlas and Castillos en el aire in 1999. These played on Canal Sur, the channel of Andalusia. León has had success in theatre throughout his career, first appearing on stage in 2001. He moved to Madrid in 2003 to continue his career, where his first big job was impersonating personalities on Homo Zapping, where he was noticed for popular imitations of women like Anne Igartiburu and Raquel Revuelta. He is best known for playing Luisma, a recovering drug addict, on Aída, a role he played for nine years and which garnered him many Best Actor awards.

He has also had notable film roles, as an OCD patient in Toc Toc and a playboy in The Tribe. As a voice and dubbing actor, he has had roles in Valiant and Madagascar, and as a film director, his debut was the 2012 Carmina or Blow Up, for which he was nominated for a Goya as Best Directorial Debut. His mother and sister star in the film, and were both nominated for acting Goyas. His third directorial feature was Kiki, Love to Love, in which he stars and was similarly multi-nominated. For his 2014 film, Carmina and Amen, the El Confidencial writer Juan Manuel Fernández suggested that he was becoming "the new Pedro Almodóvar", particularly highlighting the funeral scene that opens Carmina y amén and saying it has "a poetry only comparable to" the opening scene of Volver. Fernández also notes how both León and Almodóvar are influenced by the women in their lives, that they both often work with a sibling, and celebrate their mothers in their films.

In 2018, he created Arde Madrid with his wife at the time, Anna R. Costa, a black and white miniseries about Ava Gardner, in which he also played Gardner's chauffeur. From 2018 to 2020, he portrayed trans woman María José Riquelme on The House of Flowers. Regarding working on The House of Flowers, León says working with Verónica Castro was an honour.

In 2019, profiling the actor, Dann Dulin wrote that León's "persona and popularity are akin to a James Franco or Jake Gyllenhaal".

Shooting of León's four feature (Rainbow) wrapped by October 2021. Penned alongside Javier Gullón, it consists of a loose adaptation of The Wonderful Wizard of Oz. It is set for a 2022  release.

Personal life
He has one sister, María León, who is also an actress. Both his mother and sister starred as characters based on themselves in the films Carmina or Blow Up (2012) and Carmina and Amen (2014), which Paco wrote and directed. María and Paco also play siblings in The House of Flowers. León met the Catalan playwright Anna Rodríguez Costa in 2006 in a play, going on to act in a short she directed later that year; she was also an acting teacher to María. León said that at the time they met, he had a boyfriend, but knew that he wanted to be with her. The couple have been together since 2006 and wrote the screenplay for Arde Madrid together. They have a daughter (born 2010), and Costa's son Eloi (born c. 1994) is León's stepson. Costa also appears in Carmina and Amen.

In 2020, after 14 years together, the couple broke up.

He is openly bisexual, and actively campaigns for HIV/AIDS causes. He has several friends living with the disease and has worked with organisations including Fundación Triángulo, Apoyo Positivo, StopSIDA, and the Fight Against AIDS Foundation since at least 2009, which largely offer support to the LGBT+ community in Spain, as well as fundraising for the work of eminent HIV researcher Bonaventura Clotet. León has said that he became aware of the AIDS epidemic when Rock Hudson died, but has also had a scare personally.

León became the subject of media attention when he promised to tweet a nude photo of himself after gaining one million Twitter followers, which he did in October 2013; he posted a video running naked across a golf course to celebrate a million followers on Instagram in 2019, following this up with more nudes. He is a relatively private person and does not often give press interviews.

Filmography

Television
 Castillos en el aire (1999) on Canal Sur
 Jet Lag (2000)
 Moncloa, digame on Telecinco, FDF
 Homo Zapping on Antena 3 TV (2003–2005)
 7 vidas on Telecinco (2004, 2005)
 Aída on Telecinco (2005-2014)
 Planeta Finito on La Sexta (2007)
 Ácaros on Cuatro (2007)
 La peste on Movistar+ (2017)
 The House of Flowers (La Casa de las Flores) on Netflix (2018)
 Arde Madrid (Madrid on Fire), Movistar (2018)
 Blowing Kisses, on Star (2021)

Film 

{| class="wikitable sortable"
! Year
! Title
! Role
! Notes
! |-
| align = "center" | 2001 || Amar y Morir en Sevilla, Don Juan Tenorio || || || align = "center" | 
|-
| align = "center" | 2002 || Asalto informatico || || || align = "center" | 
|-
| align = "center" | 2003 || La vida mancha || || || align = "center" | 
|-
| align = "center" | 2004 || Recambios || || || align = "center" | 
|-
| align = "center" | 2005 || Reinas (Queens) || Narciso || || align = "center" | 
|-
| align = "center" | 2006 || La dama boba (Lady Nitwit) || Maestro de danza || || align = "center" | 
|-
| align = "center" | 2006 ||  || Pipo || || align = "center" | 
|-
| align = "center" | 2009 || Dieta mediterránea (Mediterranean Food) || Toni || || align = "center" | 
|-
| align = "center" | 2013 || 3 bodas de más (Three Many Weddings) || Mikel || || align = "center" | 
|-
| align = "center" | 2016 ||  (We Are Pregnant) || Fran || || align = "center" | 
|-
| align = "center" | 2016 || Kiki, el amor se hace (Kiki, Love to Love) || Paco || Also director-screenwriter ||  align = "center" | 
|-
| align = "center" | 2016 || 7 Años || Luis || || align = "center" | 
|-
| align = "center" | 2017 || Toc Toc || Emilio || || align = "center" | 
|-
| align = "center" | 2018 || La tribu (The Tribe) || Fidel || || align = "center" | 
|-
| align = "center" | 2021 || Mama o papá (You Keep the Kids!) || Víctor || || align = "center" | 
|-
| align = "center" | 2022 || The Unbearable Weight of Massive Talent || Lucas || || align = "center" | 
|-
| align  ="center" | 2022 || No mires a los ojos (Staring at Strangers) || Damián || || align = "center" | 
|-
| align = "center" |  ||  style="background:#FFFFCC;" | Mari(dos)  || Toni || || align = "center" | 
|}

Short films
 La grieta by Enrique López de Haro
 Días rojos (2004)
 Con lengua (2006) by Anna R. Costa
 Espagueti western'' (2007) (Voice)

Accolades

References

External links
 
 

1974 births
Living people
Spanish male film actors
Spanish male television actors
Spanish male voice actors
Spanish male comedians
Bisexual male actors
Spanish LGBT actors
Spanish bisexual people
Bisexual comedians
People from Seville
21st-century Spanish male actors
Male actors from Andalusia